Head Winds is a surviving 1925 American silent drama film directed by Herbert Blaché and starring House Peters and Patsy Ruth Miller. It was produced and distributed by Universal Pictures.

Cast

Preservation
Prints of Head Winds exist in the George Eastman Museum Motion Picture Collection and UCLA Film and Television Archive.

References

External links

1925 films
American silent feature films
Universal Pictures films
Films based on American novels
American black-and-white films
Silent American drama films
1925 drama films
Films directed by Herbert Blaché
1920s American films